Christopher Alan Clapinski (born August 20, 1971) is an American former Major League Baseball (MLB) infielder who played for the Florida Marlins in 1999 and 2000.

Biography
A native of Buffalo, New York, Clapinski attended Palm Desert High School and the University of California, Berkeley. In 1990 and 1991, he played collegiate summer baseball with the Wareham Gatemen of the Cape Cod Baseball League.

In 1992, Clapinski signed with the Florida Marlins as an amateur free agent. He made his major league debut for the Marlins in 1999, playing in 36 games for the club that season, and in 34 games for Florida the following season. While playing with the minor league Buffalo Bisons in 2004, Clapinski appeared at every position except for pitcher and catcher.

References

External links
, or Pelota Binaria

1971 births
Living people
American expatriate baseball players in Canada
Baseball players from Buffalo, New York
Brevard County Manatees players
Buffalo Bisons (minor league) players
California Golden Bears baseball players
Calgary Cannons players
Caribes de Anzoátegui players
Charlotte Knights players
Florida Marlins players
Gulf Coast Marlins players
Kane County Cougars players
Las Vegas 51s players
Louisville Bats players
Major League Baseball second basemen
Major League Baseball shortstops
Major League Baseball third basemen
Omaha Royals players
Pastora de los Llanos players
Portland Sea Dogs players
Wareham Gatemen players
American expatriate baseball players in Venezuela